The 1835 Vermont gubernatorial election was held on September 1, 1835.

Incumbent Anti-Masonic governor William A. Palmer contested the election with Democratic nominee William Czar Bradley and Whig nominee Charles Paine.

Since no candidate received a majority in the popular vote, the state constitution required the Vermont General Assembly and Vermont Executive Council to meet in joint convention and elect a governor. After 63 inconclusive ballots, the General Assembly adjourned on November 2 without making a choice. As a result, Silas H. Jennison, who had been elected Lieutenant Governor with Whig and Anti-Masonic support, served the term as acting governor.

General election

Candidates
William Czar Bradley, Democratic, former U.S. Representative, Democratic candidate for Governor in 1834
Charles Paine, Whig, former member of the Vermont House of Representatives
William A. Palmer, Anti-Masonic, incumbent governor

Results

Legislative election
As no candidate received a majority of the vote, the unicameral Vermont General Assembly, with the Executive Council, were required to decide the election, meeting as a joint body to elect a governor by majority vote.

The joint convention met in 15 different sessions on October 9 (5 ballots), 10 (2 ballots), 13 (11 ballots), 14 (4 ballots), 15, 17, 20, 21, 23, 28, 30 and November 2 (2 ballots) to elect a governor.

Incomplete results of the balloting were as follows:

The highest total for Palmer was 112, at a point when 117 was needed for election.

On November 2, after 63 ballots, the Convention voted by 113 – 100 to dissolve without electing a governor. Silas H. Jennison, elected Lieutenant Governor by a majority vote, served the term as governor.

Bibliography

References

1835
Vermont
Gubernatorial